Fenrir, Fenrisulfr or Fenris is a Norse mythological wolf. It may also refer to:

Fenrir (moon), a moon of Saturn named after Fenrisulfr
Fenris- designation of a battlemech in the science-fiction series BattleTech
Fenrir, a monster card in the Yu-Gi-Oh! Trading Card Game
Fenris, homeworld of the Space Wolves Space Marine chapter in the Warhammer 40,000 universe
Fenrir Inc, Japanese developer of Sleipnir web browser
Fenris Glacier, E Greenland

Printed media 
Fenris Ulf, or Maugrim, a character in C.S. Lewis's The Lion, the Witch, and the Wardrobe
Fenrir Greyback, a lycanthrope in the Harry Potter series
The Lord of Terror (Oh My Goddess!), from the anime series Oh My Goddess!
Fenris, character in the comic series Lucifer
 Fenris Wolf (Marvel Comics), a comic character based on the Norse wolf
Fenris (comics), a terrorist organization led by Andrea von Strucker and Andreas von Strucker, the twin children of the Marvel Comics villain Baron von Strucker
The Fenris Device, a novel/weapon in the Hooded Swan
Fenris, the varg's God in the book The Sight

Video games 
Get of Fenris, a werewolf tribe in the roleplaying game Dark Ages: Werewolf
Fenris, a character in the Quest for Glory series
The Fenris Brood, a Zerg faction in StarCraft
GTC Fenris-class cruiser in the FreeSpace, series
In Xenogears, Fenrir is the name of Citan's Omnigear
In Eve Online, Fenrir is the name of the Minmatar freighter
In Dragon Age II, Fenris is an elven warrior companion
In the Ace Combat series, Fenrir has been used as a squadron name on multiple occasions
In Final Fantasy VII: Dirge of Cerberus, Fenrir is what Cloud calls his motorcycle
In Etrian Odyssey Untold: The Millennium Girl, Fenrir is the name of the first stratum's final boss
In Danganronpa, Fenrir is the name of Mukuro's Military Corporation

See also
Fenriz (born 1971), stage name of member in Norwegian black metal band Darkthrone